The Shire of Bright was a local government area about  east-northeast of Melbourne, the state capital of Victoria, Australia.

History

Bright was first incorporated as a road district on 8 August 1862, and became a shire on 29 June 1866. On 17 May 1960, the Shire of Myrtleford was created out of its western border region.

On 18 November 1994, the Shire of Bright was abolished, and along with the Shire of Myrtleford and various surrounding districts, was merged into the newly created Alpine Shire.

Wards

The Shire of Bright was divided into four ridings on 16 May 1961, each of which elected three councillors:
 Bright Riding
 Ovens Riding
 Kiewa Riding
 Mt Beauty Riding

Towns and localities

* Council seat.

Population

* Estimate in the 1958 Victorian Year Book.

References

External links
 Victorian Places - Bright Shire

Bright